The Goldman Environmental Prize is a prize awarded annually to grassroots environmental activists, one from each of the world's six geographic regions: Africa, Asia, Europe, Islands and Island Nations, North America, and South and Central America.  The award is given by the Goldman Environmental Foundation headquartered in San Francisco, California. It is also called the Green Nobel.

The Goldman Environmental Prize was created in 1989 by philanthropists Richard and Rhoda Goldman. , the award amount is $200,000.

The winners are selected by an international jury who receive confidential nominations from a worldwide network of environmental organizations and individuals. Prize winners participate in a 10-day tour of San Francisco and Washington, D.C., for an awards ceremony and presentation, news conferences, media briefings and meetings with political, public policy, financial and environmental leaders. The award ceremony features short documentary videos on each winner, narrated by Robert Redford and (beginning in 2021) Sigourney Weaver.

The 2019 Goldman Environmental Prize ceremony marking the 30th anniversary took place on April 29, 2019, at the War Memorial Opera House in San Francisco. A second award ceremony took place on May 1, 2019, in Washington, D.C.

The 2020, 2021, and 2022 Goldman Environmental Prize ceremonies took place online due to the COVID-19 pandemic, with pre-recorded videos premiering on November 30, 2020, June 15, 2021, and May 25, 2022, respectively.

Prize winners

1990
Robert Brown (Australia)
Lois Gibbs (United States)
Janet Gibson (Belize)
Harrison Ngau Laing (Malaysia)
János Vargha (Hungary)
Michael Werikhe (Kenya)

1991
Wangari Muta Maathai (Kenya)
Barnens Regnskog (Eha Kern & Roland Tiensuu) (Sweden)
Evaristo Nugkuag (Peru)
Yoichi Kuroda (Japan)
Samuel LaBudde (United States)
Cath Wallace (New Zealand)

1992
Jeton Anjain (Marshall Islands)
Medha Patkar (India)
Wadja Egnankou (Ivory Coast)
Christine Jean (France)
Colleen McCrory (Canada)
Carlos Alberto Ricardo (Brazil)

1993
Margaret Jacobsohn & Garth Owen-Smith (Namibia)
Juan Mayr (Colombia)
Dai Qing (China)
John Sinclair (Australia)
JoAnn Tall (United States)
Sviatoslav Zabelin (Russia)

1994
Matthew Coon Come (Canada)
Tuenjai Deetes (Thailand)
Laila Iskander Kamel (Egypt)
Luis Macas (Ecuador)
Heffa Schücking (Germany)
Andrew Simmons (St. Vincent and the Grenadines)

1995
Aurora Castillo (United States)
Yul Choi (South Korea)
Noah Idechong (Palau)
Emma Must (England)
Ricardo Navarro (El Salvador)
Ken Saro-Wiwa (Nigeria)

1996
Ndyakira Amooti (Uganda)
Bill Ballantine (New Zealand)
Edwin Bustillos (Mexico)
M.C. Mehta (India)
Marina Silva (Brasil)
Albena Simeonova (Bulgaria)

1997

Nick Carter (Zambia)
Loir Botor Dingit (Indonesia)
Alexander Nikitin (Russia)
Juan Pablo Orrego (Chile)
Fuiono Senio & Paul Alan Cox (Western Samoa)
Terri Swearingen (United States)

1998
Anna Giordano (Italy)
Kory Johnson (United States)
Berito Kuwaru'wa (Colombia)
Atherton Martin (Commonwealth of Dominica)
Sven "Bobby" Peek (South Africa)
Hirofumi Yamashita (Japan)

1999
Jacqui Katona & Yvonne Margarula (Australia)
Michal Kravcik (Slovakia)
Bernard Martin (Canada)
Samuel Nguiffo (Cameroon)
Jorge Varela (Honduras)
Ka Hsaw Wa (Myanmar)

2000
Oral Ataniyazova (Uzbekistan)
Elias Diaz Peña & Oscar Rivas (Paraguay)
Vera Mischenko (Russia)
Rodolfo Montiel Flores (Mexico)
Alexander Peal (Liberia)
Nat Quansah (Madagascar)

2001
Jane Akre & Steve Wilson (reporter) (United States)
Yosepha Alomang (Indonesia)
Giorgos Catsadorakis & Myrsini Malakou (Greece)
Oscar Olivera (Bolivia)
Eugène Rutagarama (Rwanda)
Bruno Van Peteghem (New Caledonia)

2002
Pisit Charnsnoh (Thailand)
Sarah James & Jonathon Solomon (United States)
Fatima Jibrell (Somalia)
Alexis Massol González (Puerto Rico)
Norma Kassi (Canada)
Jean La Rose (Guyana)
Jadwiga Łopata (Poland)

2003
Julia Bonds (United States)
Pedro Arrojo-Agudo (Spain)
Eileen Kampakuta Brown & Eileen Wani Wingfield (Australia)
Von Hernandez (Philippines)
Maria Elena Foronda Farro (Peru)
Odigha Odigha (Nigeria)

2004

Rudolf Amenga-Etego (Ghana)
Rashida Bee and Champa Devi Shukla (India) 
Libia Grueso (Colombia) 
Manana Kochladze (Georgia)
Demetrio do Amaral de Carvalho  (East Timor) 
Margie Richard (United States)

2005
Isidro Baldenegro López (Mexico)
Kaisha Atakhanova (Kazakhstan)
Jean-Baptiste Chavannes (Haiti)
Stephanie Danielle Roth (Romania)
Corneille Ewango (Congo)
José Andrés Tamayo Cortez (Honduras)

2006
Silas Kpanan’ Siakor (Liberia)
Yu Xiaogang (China)
Olya Melen (Ukraine)
Anne Kajir (Papua New Guinea) 
Craig E. Williams (United States) 
Tarcisio Feitosa da Silva (Brazil)

2007
Sophia Rabliauskas (Manitoba, Canada)
Hammerskjoeld Simwinga (Zambia)
Tsetsgeegiin Mönkhbayar (Mongolia)
Julio Cusurichi Palacios (Peru)
Willie Corduff (Ireland)
Orri Vigfússon (Iceland)

2008
Pablo Fajardo and Luis Yanza (Ecuador)
Jesus Leon Santos (Oaxaca, Mexico)
Rosa Hilda Ramos (Puerto Rico)
Feliciano dos Santos (Mozambique)
Marina Rikhvanova (Russia)
Ignace Schops from "Hoge Kempen National Park" (Belgium)

2009

Maria Gunnoe, Bob White, West Virginia (United States)
Marc Ona, Libreville (Gabon)
Rizwana Hasan, Dhaka (Bangladesh)
Olga Speranskaya, Moscow (Russia)
Yuyun Ismawati (Bali, Indonesia)
Wanze Eduards and Hugo Jabini (Pikin Slee village and Paramaribo, Suriname)

2010

Thuli Brilliance Makama (Swaziland)
Tuy Sereivathana (Cambodia)
Małgorzata Górska (Poland)
Humberto Ríos Labrada (Cuba)
Lynn Henning (United States)
Randall Arauz (Costa Rica)

2011
 Raoul du Toit, (Zimbabwe)
 Dmitry Lisitsyn (Russia)
 Ursula Sladek (Germany)
 Prigi Arisandi (Indonesia)
 Hilton Kelley (United States)
 Francisco Pineda (El Salvador)

2012
 Ikal Angelei (Kenya)
 Ma Jun (China)
 Yevgeniya Chirikova (Russia)
 Edwin Gariguez (Philippines)
 Caroline Cannon (United States)
 Sofia Gatica (Argentina)

2013
 Azzam Alwash (Iraq)
 Aleta Baun (Indonesia)
 Jonathan Deal (South Africa)
 Rossano Ercolini (Italy)
 Nohra Padilla (Colombia)
 Kimberly Wasserman (United States)

2014
Desmond D'Sa (South Africa)
Ramesh Agrawal (India)
Suren Gazaryan (Russia)
Rudi Putra (Indonesia)
Helen Slottje (United States)
Ruth Buendia (Peru)

2015
Myint Zaw (Myanmar)
Marilyn Baptiste (Canada)
Jean Wiener (Haiti)
Phyllis Omido (Kenya)
Howard Wood (Scotland)
Berta Cáceres (Honduras)

2016

Máxima Acuña (Peru)
Zuzana Čaputová (Slovakia)
Luis Jorge Rivera Herrera (Puerto Rico)
Edward Loure (Tanzania)
Leng Ouch (Cambodia)
Destiny Watford (United States)

2017
Wendy Bowman (Australia)
Rodrigue Mugaruka Katembo (Democratic Republic of the Congo)
mark! Lopez (United States)
Uroš Macerl (Slovenia)
Prafulla Samantara (India)
Rodrigo Tot (Guatemala)

2018
Manny Calonzo (Philippines)
Francia Márquez (Colombia)
Nguy Thi Khanh (Vietnam)
LeeAnne Walters (United States)
Makoma Lekalakala and Liz McDaid (South Africa)
Claire Nouvian (France)

2019
Bayarjargal Agvaantseren (Mongolia)
Alfred Brownell (Liberia)
Alberto Curamil (Chile)
Jacqueline Evans (Cook Islands)
Linda Garcia (United States)
Ana Colovic Lesoska (North Macedonia)

2020
Chibeze Ezekiel (Ghana)
Kristal Ambrose (The Bahamas)
Leydy Pech (Mexico)
Lucie Pinson (France)
Nemonte Nenquimo (Ecuador)
Paul Sein Twa (Myanmar)

2021
Gloria Majiga-Kamoto (Malawi)
Thai Van Nguyen (Vietnam)
Maida Bilal (Bosnia and Herzegovina)
Kimiko Hirata (Japan)
Sharon Lavigne (United States)
Liz Chicaje Churay (Peru)

2022
Chima Williams (Nigeria)
Niwat Roykaew (Thailand)
Marjan Minnesma (Netherlands)
Julien Vincent (Australia)
Nalleli Cobo (United States)
Alex Lucitante and Alexandra Narváez Trujillo (Ecuador)

See also
 Environmental Media Awards
 Global 500 Roll of Honour
 Goldman School of Public Policy
 Grantham Prize for Excellence in Reporting on the Environment
 Heroes of the Environment
 Tyler Prize for Environmental Achievement
 List of people associated with renewable energy
 List of environmental awards

References

External links

Awards established in 1990
Environmental awards